Thamnolia is a genus of lichens in the family Icmadophilaceae. Members of the genus are commonly called whiteworm lichens.

Two species of Thamnolia are used by  ethnic peoples of Yunnan Province (China) as a component of purported health-promoting tea: Thamnolia vermicularis, and T. subuliformis.

Species
Thamnolia juncea 
Thamnolia papelillo 
Thamnolia subuliformis 
Thamnolia taurica 
Thamnolia tundrae 
Thamnolia vermicularis

References

Pertusariales
Pertusariales genera
Taxa named by Ludwig Schaerer
Taxa described in 1850
Lichen genera